Tomocerus minor is a species of springtail in the family Tomoceridae. It is widespread from the Arctic to Europe, Western and Central Asia down to the Sino-Japanese, Northern and Pacific North America, Hawaii, the Caribbean mainland and New Zealand.

References

Collembola
Animals described in 1862
Taxa named by John Lubbock, 1st Baron Avebury
Arthropods of North America
Arthropods of Asia